Goose Eye Mountain, also known as Mt. Goose High, is a mountain located in Oxford County, Maine, about . (2 km) east of the New Hampshire-Maine border. The mountain is the second-highest peak of the Mahoosuc Range of the White Mountains.

Description
Goose Eye Mtn. is flanked to the northeast by Fulling Mill Mountain, and to the southwest by Mount Carlo.

Goose Eye Mountain stands within the watershed of the Androscoggin River, which wraps around the Mahoosuc Range and drains into Merrymeeting Bay, the estuary of the Kennebec River, and then into the Gulf of Maine. The south side of Goose Eye drains via various streams into Sunday River and the Androscoggin. The northeast side of Goose Eye drains into Goose Eye Brook, then into Sunday River. The west side of the mountain drains via various streams into the South Branch of Stearns Brook, and then into the Androscoggin.

The Goose Eye Trail is a popular dayhike in the summer and fall, as is the Wright Trail.

See also 
 Old Speck Mountain
 List of mountains in Maine
 New England Hundred Highest

References

Mountains of Oxford County, Maine
New England Hundred Highest
Mountains on the Appalachian Trail
Mountains of Maine